The 139th Pennsylvania was an infantry regiment in the Union Army during the American Civil War.

History
The 139th was formed at Camp Howe, near Pittsburgh, on September 1, 1862. Frederick H. Collier was the first colonel. After burying the dead on the field of Second Battle of Bull Run, the regiment was attached to Howe's Brigade of Couch's Division of the IV Corps  of the Army of the Potomac where it replaced De Trobriand's 55th New York, Gardes Lafayette regiment on September 11, 1862. The composition of this brigade remained unchanged from this point until the war's end and included the 62d NY, 93d PVI, 98th PVI and the 102d PVI.

During this time Couch's Division was detached from the Army and was occupied with guarding the fords on the Potomac. The 139th along with its brigade and division spent the next week marching from Poolesville to Sandy Hook, Maryland, from where on September 17, 1862, it was forced marched to the Battle of Antietam where it was placed in line of battle but did not see any significant combat. The next day, the regiment pursued the Confederate army and fought in a skirmish at Williamsport.

The 139th was transferred in October 1862 to the VI Corps. In the Battle of Fredericksburg, it suffered minor casualties from artillery fire, but didn't get a chance to fight. Five months later, however, it did participate in the 2nd Battle of Fredericksburg. At the Battle of Gettysburg in July, it helped defend the left flank of the Union army.

Throughout the spring and into early summer of 1864, the 139th fought in Grant's Overland Campaign and the early stages of the Siege of Petersburg. In July, it was transferred to Washington, D.C. with the rest of the VI Corps to defeat Lt. Gen. Jubal Early's attack on the city. Then they fought under Philip Sheridan in the Valley to ensure that no more Confederate armies would invade again. (See the article on the campaign). By December 1864, they were back in the siege lines of Petersburg.

The 139th supported Sheridan in the Appomattox Campaign and fought in the Battle of Sailor's Creek. After the surrender at Appomattox Courthouse, it was ordered to the North Carolina border to support William T. Sherman, but the Confederate surrender there made further support unnecessary. The regiment was mustered out June 21, 1865.

Casualties
Killed and mortally wounded: 10 officers, 135 enlisted men
Wounded: ? officers, ? enlisted men
Died of disease: 5 officers, 86 enlisted men
Captured or missing: ? officers, ? men
Total casualties: ? officers, ? men

References
Unit history from the Pennsylvania in the Civil War site

Units and formations of the Union Army from Pennsylvania
History of Pittsburgh
1862 establishments in Pennsylvania
Military units and formations established in 1862
Military units and formations disestablished in 1865